Joshua Thomas Doan (born February 1, 2002) is an American professional ice hockey winger currently playing for the Tucson Roadrunners of the American Hockey League (AHL) as a prospect to the Arizona Coyotes of the National Hockey League (NHL). The Coyotes selected Doan with the 37th overall pick in the 2021 NHL Entry Draft. He is the son of Coyotes franchise scoring leader and team executive Shane Doan.

Playing career 
While growing up in Arizona, Doan played in the Phoenix Jr. Coyotes program. The Chicago Steel of the United States Hockey League (USHL) selected Doan with the 95th overall pick of the 2018 USHL Futures Draft.

On June 21, 2019, Doan announced his commitment to play for Arizona State University. He began his collegiate career at ASU in the 2021–22 season.

Doan played one more year with the Jr. Coyotes before joining the Steel for the 2019–20 season. He tied for 16th on the team with 14 points (five goals, nine assists) in 45 games and was passed over by all 31 teams in the 2020 NHL Entry Draft.

In his second year of draft eligibility, Doan returned to the Steel and emerged as one of the scoring leaders on the USHL's Clark Cup championship team. He finished third on both the Steel — behind Sean Farrell and Matthew Coronato — and in the entire league with 70 points (31 goals, 39 assists) in 53 games. The NHL Central Scouting Bureau ranked the 19-year-old Doan as the 87th-best North American skater eligible for the 2021 NHL Entry Draft.

On July 24, 2021, the Arizona Coyotes selected Doan in the second-round with the 37th overall pick in the 2021 draft. Doan's father, Shane, played his entire 21-year NHL career for the Coyotes franchise and currently serves as the team's chief hockey development officer.

Following completion of his sopohmore year as captain of the Sun Devils in the 2022–23 season, Doan concluded his collegiate career by signing a three-year, entry-level contract with the Arizona Coyotes on March 16, 2023. With his contract not due to commence until the 2023–24 season, Doan was signed by the Coyotes AHL affiliate, the Tucson Roadrunners, for the remainder of their season.

Career statistics

Awards and honors

References

External links 
 

2002 births
Living people
Arizona Coyotes draft picks
Arizona State Sun Devils men's ice hockey players
American men's ice hockey forwards
Chicago Steel players
Sportspeople from Arizona
Tucson Roadrunners players